Laura Street may refer to:

Laura Street - a street in the Northbank district of Jacksonville, Florida.
Laura Street Trio - a group of historic buildings in Jacksonville, Florida, United States